Open is a 2019 Philippine romance drama film directed by Andoy Ranay starring JC Santos and Arci Muñoz. The film was produced by Black Sheep Productions and T-Rex Entertainment and is distributed by Star Cinema. The film also produced by executive producers Carlo L. Katigbak, Olivia M. Lamasan and Rex A. Tiri. The film is one of the entries for the Pista ng Pelikulang Pilipino 2019. The film was released on September 13, 2019.

Synopsis
Rome (Muñoz) and Ethan (Santos) have been together for 14 years. He is the love of her life, and she is his number one supporter. They are each other's firsts, and to their friends, they are the perfect couple. When the two begin to feel that their relationship has gone stale, they explore the idea of going open. It's something Ethan wants to do, and it's the only way Rome feels she can keep her man. They agree that they are allowed to have sex with strangers, but they are not allowed to fall in love. In a relationship built over time, the two begin to “explore” expecting to salvage the exact same thing they are giving up. In the end, they learn the importance of the very thing they have been blind to -- a relationship without trust will eventually crumble.

Cast

Main cast
JC Santos as Ethan
Arci Muñoz as Romina / Rome

Supporting cast
Ina Raymundo as Erika
Sofia Andres as Mia
Ivana Alawi as Monique
Jenny Miller as Mica
Alexa Ilacad as Mika
Vance Larena as Archie
Troy Montero as Norman
Micah Muñoz as Sam
Mark McMahon as Kevin
Frances Makil-Ignacio as Carla
Erika Padilla as Shiela
Che Ramos as EM
Ross Pesigan as Daniel
Ge Villamil as Estelle
Rosalind Wee as Mrs. Sanchez

Release
The film was released on September 13, 2019 during the 3rd Pista ng Pelikulang Pilipino.

References

External links
 

2019 films
Films directed by Andoy Ranay